The  is a Kofun period burial mound located in the Azuchi neighborhood of the city of Ōmihachiman, Shiga Prefecture in the Kansai region of Japan. The tumulus was designated a National Historic Site of Japan in 1957. With a total length of 134 meters, it is the largest kofun in Shiga Prefecture, and is estimated to have been built around the middle of the 4th century AD (early Kofun period).

Overview
The Azuchi-Hyōtanyama Kofun is located on a ridge extending from Mount Kinugasa, at the western foot of Mount Kannonji on the eastern shore of Lake Biwa. At the time of its construction, the water level of Lake Biwa was higher than at present, and this ridge was a peninsula extending into the lake. The main road connecting the Gamō and Kōka Districts of Ōmi Province is at the base of this peninsula, thus the tumulus was on a strategic position overlooking both land and water transportation.

The tumulus was excavated from 1935 to 1936. The mound is considerably weathered and it is not certain if it was constructed in tiers, or if it had fukiishi. However, numerous cylindrical haniwa and earthenware jars with perforated bottoms have been found. The burial chamber consisted of three pit-type stone-lined chambers in the posterior circular portion, and two box-type sarcophagus in the anterior rectangular portion. A large quantity of grave goods was recovered from these five burial chambers, including bronze mirrors, iron swords and spearheads, bronze arrowheads, beads and shell jewelry. The central stone chamber in the posterior circular portion is considered to be the main burial.

Gallery

The tumulus is located bout 25-minute walk from Azuchi Station on the JR West Tōkaidō Main Line.

Overall length 134 meters
Posterior circular portion 78 meter diameter x 13 meter high 
 "Neck" portion 56 meters wide 
Anterior rectangular portion 62 meters wide x 7 meters high

See also
List of Historic Sites of Japan (Shiga)

References

External links

Shige Prefecture Department of Education 

Kofun
Archaeological sites in Japan
History of Shiga Prefecture
Ōmihachiman, Shiga
Historic Sites of Japan